Aquatic Sciences and Fisheries Abstracts is an abstracting and indexing service covering aquatic science and its subfields. It is maintained by the Food and Agriculture Organization (FAO) of the United Nations. It replaced the previous Current Bibliography for Aquatic Sciences and Fisheries (FAO) and Aquatic Biology Abstracts.

Further reading 

Allen Varley et al. (Intergovernmental Oceanographic Commission) (1995) ASFA: The First Twenty Years. An Outline History of Aquatic Sciences and Fisheries Abstracts, 1971–1990, UNESCO, IOC/INF-994.

External links 

 Aquatic Sciences and Fisheries Abstracts website
 Food and Agriculture Organization website

Bibliographic databases and indexes